Ingrid Lorvik (born 21 February 1986) is a Norwegian racing cyclist, who most recently rode for UCI Women's Continental Team . She competed in the 2013 UCI women's road race in Florence.

Major results

2014
 3rd Road race, National Road Championships
 5th Overall Tour de Feminin-O cenu Českého Švýcarska
1st Stage 1
2015
 3rd Road race, National Road Championships
 6th Overall Gracia–Orlová
1st Stage 2
2017
 3rd Road race, National Road Championships
2018
 8th Overall The Princess Maha Chackri Sirindhorn's Cup "Women's Tour of Thailand"
2019
 1st  Road race, National Road Championships
 5th Overall Vuelta a Burgos Feminas
2020
 8th Overall Dubai Women's Tour

References

External links

1986 births
Living people
Norwegian female cyclists
Place of birth missing (living people)
21st-century Norwegian women